Supporters of republicanism in the United Kingdom—replacing the country's monarchy with a republic—typically favour an elected head of state to a constitutional monarch who heads the British royal family.

Individuals (living)

Politicians (serving)

Jonathan Bartley, theologian and former co-leader of the Green Party of England and Wales
Natalie Bennett, peer and former co-leader of the Green Party of England and Wales
Richard Burgon, MP (Labour)
Katy Clark, MSP (Scottish Labour), peer and former MP (Labour)
Tom Copley, Deputy Mayor of London for Housing and Residential Development and former AM (Labour Co-op)
Jeremy Corbyn, MP (former leader of the Labour Party)
Mark Drakeford, MS (Welsh Labour), First Minister of Wales
George Foulkes, peer, former MP and MSP (Labour, Scottish Labour)
Rob Gibson, MSP (Scottish National Party)
Christine Grahame, MSP (SNP)
Nia Griffith, MP (Labour)
John Griffiths, MS (Welsh Labour)
Llyr Gruffydd, MS (Plaid Cymru)
Peter Hain, peer and former MP (Labour)
Patrick Harvie, MSP and co-leader of the Scottish Greens
Elin Jones, MS (Plaid Cymru) and Llywydd (Presiding Officer) of Senedd Cymru
Clive Lewis, MP (Labour)
Caroline Lucas, MP and former co-leader of the Green Party of England and Wales
John McDonnell, MP (Labour)
Paul McLennan, MSP (SNP)
Lisa Nandy, MP (Labour)
John Prescott, peer, former MP (Labour) and Deputy Prime Minister of the United Kingdom
Ash Regan, MSP (SNP)
Tommy Sheppard, MP (SNP)
Ken Skates, MS (Welsh Labour)
Andy Slaughter, MP (Labour)
Cat Smith, MP (Labour)
Dick Taverne, peer (Liberal Democrats) and former MP (Labour, Democratic Labour)
Mercedes Villalba, MSP (Scottish Labour)
Humza Yousaf, MSP (SNP)

Politicians (former)

Norman Baker, former MP (Liberal Democrats)
John Biggs, former Labour mayor of Tower Hamlets
Russell Brown, former MP (Labour)
Ronnie Campbell, former MP (Labour)
Michael Clapham, former MP (Labour)
David Crausby, former MP (Labour)
Roseanna Cunningham, former MSP (SNP)
Ian Davidson, former MP (Labour)
Ron Davies, former MP (Labour), Independent councillor and political activist (Plaid Cymru)
Emma Dent Coad, former MP (Labour)
Bill Etherington, former MP (Labour)
Linda Fabiani, former MSP (SNP)
Roger Godsiff, former MP (Labour)
David Hanson, former MP (Labour)
Roy Hattersley, former MP (Labour) and peer
Derek Hatton, former deputy leader of Liverpool City Council (Labour)
John Heppell, former MP (Labour)
Kelvin Hopkins, former MP (Labour)
Julian Huppert, former MP (Liberal Democrats)
Brian Iddon, former MP (Labour)
Lynne Jones, former MP (Labour)
Rosie Kane, former MSP (Scottish Socialist Party)
Ken Livingstone, former mayor of London and Labour MP
Andrew MacKinlay, former MP (Labour) and councillor (Liberal Democrats)
Denis MacShane, author and former MP (Labour)
Magid Magid, former MEP (Green Party of England and Wales) and Lord Mayor of Sheffield
David Marquand, academic, author and former MP (Labour)
Bob Marshall-Andrews, barrister and former MP (Labour)
John McAllion, former MP and MSP (Labour)
Natalie McGarry, former MP (SNP and Independent)
Jim McGovern, former MP (Labour)
Ann McKechin, former MP (Labour)
Chris Mullin, former MP (Labour)
Doug Naysmith, former MP (Labour)
Stephen Pound, former MP (Labour)
Gordon Prentice, former MP (Labour)
Murad Qureshi, former AM (Labour)
Ken Ritchie, former Labour councillor, psephologist and founder of Labour for a Republic
Phil Sawford, former MP (Labour)
Bethan Sayed, former MS (Plaid Cymru)
Jim Sillars, former MP (Labour and SNP)
Dennis Skinner, former MP (Labour)
Graham Watson, former MEP (Liberal Democrat)
Sandra White, former MSP (SNP)
Chris Williamson, former MP (Labour and Independent)
Bill Wilson, former MSP (SNP) and political activist (Scottish Greens)
Leanne Wood, former MS (former leader of Plaid Cymru)

Political activists

Tariq Ali, author and political activist
Jamie Bevan, Welsh language activist
Julie Bindel, writer and political activist
Catherine Mayer, author and co-founder of the Women's Equality Party
Alan McCombes, Scottish Socialist Party campaigner
Gareth Miles, Welsh language activist
Craig Murray, former diplomat and activist
Mike Small, Scottish author and activist
Peter Tatchell, gay rights campaigner
Kevin Williamson, Scottish writer and activist

Political staff and advisors
Alastair Campbell, political strategist, journalist and author
Philip Collins, journalist and former chief speechwriter to Tony Blair
Andrew Fisher, political adviser and consultant
Lance Price, writer, journalist and former political adviser to Tony Blair

Trade unionists
John Edmonds, former General Secretary of GMB Union
Mick Lynch, General Secretary of the National Union of Rail, Maritime and Transport Workers (RMT)
Arthur Scargill, former trade union leader, leader of the Socialist Labour Party

Journalists and non-fiction writers

Yasmin Alibhai-Brown, columnist for The Independent
Jackie Ashley, journalist
Julian Baggini, philosopher and writer
Piers Brendon, historian and writer
Emma Brockes, author and journalist
Heather Brooke, journalist, writer and FOI activist
Julie Burchill, writer and columnist
Beatrix Campbell, journalist and author
Nick Cohen, columnist for The Observer
Michael Collins, writer and broadcaster
Robert Crampton, journalist (The Times)
Bill Emmott, former editor of The Economist
Otto English, author and journalist
Jonathan Freedland, journalist
Roy Greenslade, journalist and academic
Johann Hari, writer and journalist
Lester Holloway, journalist and former councillor (Labour)
Mick Hume, journalist
Owen Jones, journalist
Kitty Kelley, American journalist and author
Simon Kelner, journalist and former editor of The Independent
A. L. Kennedy, writer and academic
Philippe Legrain, economist and writer
Tim Lott, author
Iain Macwhirter, political commentator
Kevin Maguire, journalist
Kenan Malik, writer, lecturer and broadcaster
Andrew MacGregor Marshall, journalist
Allegra McEvedy, chef and food writer
Chris McLaughlin, journalist
Suzanne Moore, journalist 
Tom Nairn, essayist
Brendan O'Neill, journalist
Susie Orbach, psychotherapist and writer
Stephen Pollard, author and journalist
Jay Rayner, food critic
Brian Reade, Daily Mirror columnist
Vicky Richardson, journalist
Paul Routledge, Daily Mirror journalist
Frances Ryan, journalist and political activist
Ash Sarkar, journalist and political activist
Miranda Sawyer, journalist
Mark Seddon, journalist
Will Self, journalist
Joan Smith, novelist, journalist and human rights activist
Polly Toynbee, columnist for The Guardian
Janice Turner, journalist and columnist for The Times
Francis Wheen, journalist, writer and broadcaster
Andreas Whittam Smith, journalist (co-founder and first editor of The Independent)
Peter Wilby, journalist
Gary Younge, journalist

Novelists and fiction authors 

 Martin Amis, novelist
 Philippa Gregory, novelist
Mark Haddon, novelist
James Kelman, novelist and playwright
Kathy Lette, novelist
John Niven, screenwriter and author
Caryl Phillips, novelist
Philip Pullman, author
Michèle Roberts, novelist and poet
Sara Sheridan, author and historical novelist
Zadie Smith, author
Jonathan Trigell, author

Broadcasters 

Simon Fanshawe, writer and broadcaster
Mariella Frostrup, journalist and broadcaster
Julia Hartley-Brewer, radio presenter and political journalist
Anthony Holden, writer, broadcaster and critic
Mark Kermode, film critic, journalist
Paul Mason, political commentator and author
Fiona Phillips, journalist and broadcaster
Amol Rajan, journalist and broadcaster
Matthew Wright, broadcaster and journalist

Business people
Dawn Airey, media executive and sports administrator
Alan McGee, co-founder of Creation Records and Poptones
Tim Waterstone, founder of Waterstones bookshops and author

Actors

Steve Coogan, actor and comedian
Ben Dover, pornographic actor
Christopher Eccleston
Colin Firth
Mark Gatiss, actor, comedian, screenwriter and novelist
Glenda Jackson, actor and former MP (Labour)
Margot Leicester, actor
Mark McGann, actor, director, musician, writer
Paul McGann
Josh O'Connor
Daniel Radcliffe
Dougray Scott
Michael Sheen
Elaine C. Smith
Samuel West, actor and director

Comedians

Frankie Boyle, comedian and writer
Jo Brand
Russell Brand, comedian, actor, campaigner
Robin Ince, comedian, actor and writer
Eddie Izzard, comedian, actor and writer
Lloyd Langford
Rob Newman
John Oliver, actor and comedian, host of Last Week Tonight with John Oliver
Mark Steel
Mark Thomas, comedian, author and activist
Tracey Ullman, actor and comedian
Henning Wehn

Singers, musicians and composers
James Dean Bradfield, lead vocalist and guitarist of the Manic Street Preachers
Ray Burns (Captain Sensible), musician
Mark 'Barney' Greenway, singer
Paul Heaton, singer (The Beautiful South)
Johnny Marr, musician, singer and songwriter (formerly of The Smiths)
Sean Moore, musician (Manic Street Preachers)
Morrissey, singer-songwriter and author (formerly of The Smiths)
Craig Reid, musician (The Proclaimers)
Charlie Reid, musician (The Proclaimers)
Paul Simonon, musician (formerly of The Clash)
Robert Smith, musician (The Cure)
Nicky Wire, musician (Manic Street Preachers)

Artists
Steve Bell, cartoonist
Peter Fluck, caricaturist and satirist
Mark McGowan, performance artist known as Chunky Mark and The Artist Taxi Driver
Ralph Steadman, cartoonist

Theatre and film directors
John Boorman, film director
Danny Boyle, Academy Award-winning film director
Richard Eyre, theatre and film director
Stephen Frears, film director and producer
Paul Greengrass, film director and screenwriter
Mike Leigh, writer and director of film and theatre
Ken Loach, film and television director

Screenwriters and playwrights
Jon Canter, television comedy writer
Maureen Chadwick, screenwriter, dramatist and television producer
Michael Frayn, author and playwright
David Hare, playwright
Julia Pascal, playwright and theatre director

Poets

Mike Jenkins
Patrick Jones, poet, playwright and filmmaker
Liz Lochhead, Makar (National Poet for Scotland) and essayist
Sean O'Brien, poet and critic
Michael Rosen, novelist and poet
Luke Wright
Benjamin Zephaniah

Sportspeople
Joey Barton, football manager and former footballer
Stan Collymore, former footballer
Frankie Dettori, Italian jockey
Brian Moore, former rugby union player

Legal professionals

Louise Christian, human rights lawyer
Imran Khan, lawyer
Michael Mansfield, QC
Geoffrey Robertson, QC
Clive Stafford Smith, lawyer and human rights campaigner

Academics
Richard Dawkins, evolutionary biologist and writer
Gregor Gall, writer and academic
Ted Honderich, academic and philosopher
Laura McAllister, Professor of Public Policy and the Governance of Wales at the Wales Governance Centre, Cardiff University
Steven Rose, scientist and writer
Quentin Skinner, academic and historian
Adam Tomkins, academic and former MSP (Scottish Conservatives)
Nigel Warburton, academic and philosopher

Religious figures
Pete Broadbent, Bishop of Willesden

Individuals (deceased)

Politicians

Tony Banks (1942–2006), MP and peer (Labour)
Tony Benn (1925–2014), MP (Labour) 
Charles Bradlaugh (1833–1891), MP (Liberal)
George Buchanan (1890–1955), MP (Labour)
William Cluse (1875–1955), MP (Labour)
Richard Crossman (1907–1974), MP (Labour) and editor of the New Statesman
Donald Dewar (1937–2000), Scottish Labour politician and First Minister of Scotland
Sir Charles Dilke (1843–1911), MP (Liberal)
Jack Dormand (1919–2003), MP and peer (Labour)
Raymond Fletcher (1921–1991), MP (Labour)
Paul Flynn (1935–2019), MP (Labour)
Michael Foot (1913–2010), MP (Labour) and Leader of the Opposition
Willie Gallacher (1881–1965), MP (Communist Party of Great Britain)
Arthur Greenwood (1880–1954), MP (Labour)
Willie Hamilton (1917–2000), MP (Labour)
George Hardie (1873–1937), MP (Labour)
Keir Hardie (1856–1915), MP and founder of the Labour Party
Emrys Hughes (1894 –1969), MP (Labour) and journalist
William Keenan (1889–1955), MP (Labour)
George Lansbury (1859–1940), MP (Labour) and Leader of the Opposition
Margo MacDonald (1943–2014), MP and MSP (SNP)
James Maxton (1885–1946), MP (Independent Labour Party)
Valentine McEntee (1871–1953), MP (Labour)
John McGovern (1887–1968), MP (Labour)
Kevin McNamara (1934–2017), MP (Labour)
Michael Meacher (1939–2015), MP (Labour)
John Stuart Mill (1806–1873), MP (Liberal), philosopher and political economist
Peter Mond, 4th Baron Melchett (1948–2018), life peer (Labour) and campaigner
Mo Mowlam (1949–2005), MP (Labour) and Secretary of State for Northern Ireland
Stan Orme (1923–2005), MP (Labour)
Gwilym Prys-Davies (1923–2017), peer (Labour)
Richard Rogers (1933–2021), peer (Labour) and architect
Alfred Salter (1873–1945), MP (Labour), 1925–45
Nancy Seear (1913–1997), peer and social scientist (Liberal, then Liberal Democrats)
Algernon Sidney (1623–1683), English politician and political theorist
Campbell Stephen (1884–1947), MP (Independent Labour Party)
Ernest Thurtle (1884–1954), MP (Labour)
Kay Ullrich (1943–2021), MSP (SNP)
Benjamin Vaughan (1751–1835), political economist and MP

Political activists and social reformers

Jeremy Bentham (1748–1832), philosopher, jurist and social reformer
Julian Cayo-Evans (1937–1995), Welsh political activist and leader of the Free Wales Army
Dennis Coslett (1939–2004), Welsh political activist (Free Wales Army) and author
George William Foote (1850–1915), secularist and journal editor; secretary of the London Republican Club (1870) and National Republican League (1871)
John Frost (1750–1842), English radical
Stephen Maxwell (1942–2012), SNP activist
Trefor Morgan (1914–1970), Welsh nationalist activist
Thomas Muir of Huntershill (1765–1799), Scottish political reformer
Mary Wollstonecraft (1759–1797), feminist writer and philosopher

Journalists, authors and writers

J. G. Ballard (1930–2009), novelist
William Blake (1757–1827), writer and artist
Robert Burns (1759–1796), poet and lyricist
Carmen Callil (1938–2022), writer and publisher
John Cole (1927–2013), BBC political editor
Thomas Davison (1794–1826), journalist and publisher
A. A. Gill (1954–2016), journalist and critic
Thomas Gordon (c. 1691–1750), Scottish writer and Commonwealthman
Alasdair Gray (1934–2019), Scottish author
Barbara Hall (1923–2022), crossword compiler and writer
James Harrington (1611–1677), political theorist and author
Christopher Hitchens (1949–2011), author and columnist
Leonard Hobhouse (1864–1929), political theorist
Mervyn Jones (1922–2010), writer 
Ethel Mannin (1900–1984), novelist and travel writer
Kingsley Martin (1897–1969), editor of the New Statesman, 1930–60
John Milton (1608–1674), poet
Edwin Morgan (1920–2010), Makar (National Poet for Scotland) and translator
Jan Morris (1926–2020), historian and writer
William Morris (1834–1896), writer and artist
Deborah Orr (1962–2019), journalist
Thomas Paine (1737–1809), English-American author and revolutionary
Ronald Payne (1926–2013), journalist and war correspondent
Edward Pearce (1939–2018), New Statesman contributor
Claire Rayner (1931–2010), journalist
George W. M. Reynolds (1814–1879), author and journalist
Percy Bysshe Shelley (1792–1822), English Romantic poet
Sue Townsend (1946–2014), author (wrote the best-selling political satire The Queen and I in which Britain becomes a republic, later adapted as a TV drama on Sky One, and its sequel, Queen Camilla (novel))
H. G. Wells (1866–1946), writer
Peter Whelan (1931–2014), playwright
Gwyn A. Williams (1925–1995), historian

Singers, musicians and composers
Robert Simpson (1921–1997), composer

Actors
Honor Blackman (1925–2020)
Andrew Ray (1939–2003), actor who played the Duke of York (George VI) in Edward and Mrs Simpson and the Duke of Windsor (Edward VIII) in Passion and Paradise

Artists
Terence Conran (1931–2020), designer and restauranteur
William James Linton (1812–1897), wood-engraver and author

Legal professionals
Anthony Scrivener (1935–2015), QC
Nathaniel Wade (c. 1666?–1718), English lawyer

Academics
Patrick Collinson (1929–2011), historian
Bernard Crick (1929–2008), academic and political philosopher
Stephen Haseler (1942–2017), professor, author

Military personnel
Robert Overton (c. 1609–1678), English soldier and scholar
John Lawson (ca. 1615–1665), naval officer

Religious figures
Joseph Fawcett (c. 1758–1804), English Presbyterian minister and poet
Donald Soper (1903–1998), Methodist minister and peer (Labour)

Media figures
Max Clifford (1943–2017), publicist
Tony Garnett (1936–2020), television producer

Other public figures 

 Nicholas Culpeper (1616–1654), botanist, herbalist, physician and astrologer

Groups

Green Party of England and Wales
Republic
Labour for a Republic
Our Republic
Scottish Greens
Scottish Socialist Party
Scottish Republican Socialist Movement

Notes

References